Silence is Goldfish is the third novel by Annabel Pitcher. It tells the story of a girl named Tess who, upon discovering a family secret, decides to stop talking as a result of her rage. All her life she's had a pressure to please her parents and be a certain way, so decides to completely withdraw from everyone and everything she's ever known.

The book was published in 2015 by Indigo, an imprint of Orion Children's Books.

References

2015 British novels
Orion Books books